The Cassinga mine is a large iron mine located in south-western Angola in Huíla Province. Cassinga represents one of the largest iron ore reserves in Angola and in the world having estimated reserves of 1 billion tonnes of ore grading 30% iron metal.

References 

Iron mines in Angola